Wedding Night (Swedish: Bröllopsnatten) is a 1947 Swedish comedy film directed by Bodil Ipsen and starring Max Hansen, Sickan Carlsson and Inga Landgré. It was shot at the Sundbyberg Studios in Stockholm. The film's sets were designed by the art director Max Linder. It is an adaptation of the 1944 British play Is Your Honeymoon Really Necessary?.

Synopsis
A man's plans to get married to his fiancée are thwarted by the fact he has not yet got a divorce from his previous wife.

Cast
 Max Hansen as Albert Lorentz
 Sickan Carlsson as 	Yvonne
 Inga Landgré as 	Mary
 Lauritz Falk as 	Rickard, lawyer
 John Botvid as 	Heming
 Julia Cæsar as 	Anna
 Sten Hedlund as 	Blom
 Solveig Lagström as 	Woman at the tea party 
 Arne Lindblad as 	Berggren, wig maker

References

Bibliography 
 Krawc, Alfred. International Directory of Cinematographers, Set- and Costume Designers in Film: Denmark, Finland, Norway, Sweden (from the beginnings to 1984). Saur, 1986.

External links 
 

1947 films
Swedish comedy films
1947 comedy films
1940s Swedish-language films
Films directed by Bodil Ipsen
Swedish films based on plays
1940s Swedish films